Oscaecilia koepckeorum is a species of caecilian in the family Caeciliidae. It is endemic to Peru. Its natural habitats are subtropical or tropical moist lowland forests, plantations, rural gardens, and heavily degraded former forest.

References

Oscaecilia
Amphibians of Peru
Amphibians described in 1984
Taxonomy articles created by Polbot